3 Ceti is a single, orange-hued star located around 2,100 light years away in the equatorial constellation of Cetus. It is visible to the naked eye with an apparent visual magnitude of 4.95. The star is moving closer to the Earth with a heliocentric radial velocity of −42 km/s.

This is a supergiant star with a stellar classification of K3 Ib, although Houk and Swift (1999) classed it as a normal giant at K3 III. It displays microvariability, undergoing changes in brightness with a frequency of 11.2 times per day and an amplitude of 0.0053 in magnitude. The star is about 30 million years old with nine times the mass of the Sun. It is radiating 10,170 times the Sun's luminosity from its photosphere at an effective temperature of 4,152 K.

References

K-type giants
Runaway stars
Cetus (constellation)
BD-11 6194
Ceti, 03
225212
000355
9103
J00043012-1030344